Wasen may refer to:
 German name of the Hanság region
 Wasen im Emmental 
 Cannstatter Wasen, 35 hectare festival area on the banks of the Neckar river in Bad Cannstatt, Stuttgart